Bergholtz may refer to:

 Bergholtz (surname)
 Bergholtz, Haut-Rhin, a commune in Haut-Rhin, Alsace, France
 Bergholtz (wine) and Bergholtz-Zell, two Alsace wines
 Bergholtz, New York

See also
 Bergholz (disambiguation)